Hatsashen is a village in the Talin Municipality of the Aragatsotn Province of Armenia.

References 

Populated places in Aragatsotn Province
Yazidi populated places in Armenia